Ghazi Amanullah Khan (1 June 1892 – 25 April 1960) was the sovereign of Afghanistan from 1919, first as Emir and after 1926 as King, until his abdication in 1929. After the end of the Third Anglo-Afghan War in August 1919, Afghanistan was able to relinquish its protected state status to proclaim independence and pursue an independent foreign policy free from the influence of the United Kingdom.

His rule was marked by dramatic political and social change, including attempts to modernise Afghanistan along Western lines.  He did not fully succeed in achieving this objective due to an uprising by Habibullah Kalakani and his followers. On 14 January 1929, Amanullah abdicated and fled to neighbouring British India as the Afghan Civil War began to escalate. From British India, he went to Europe, where after 30 years in exile, he died in Italy, in 1960 (yet apparently and reportedly according to the Encyclopaedia Britannica, Amanullah  died in Zürich in Switzerland). His body was brought to Afghanistan and buried in Jalalabad near his father Habibullah Khan's tomb.

Early years

Amanullah Khan was born on 1 June 1892, in Paghman near Kabul, Afghanistan. He was the favoured and the third son of the Emir Habibullah Khan. Amanullah was installed as the governor of Kabul, and was in control of the army and the treasury. He gained the allegiance of most of the tribal leaders.

In February 1919, Emir Habibullah Khan went on a hunting trip to Afghanistan's Laghman Province. Among those in his retinue were his brother Nasrullah Khan, Habibullah's first son Inayatullah, and Habibullah's commander-in-chief Nadir Khan. On the evening of 20 February 1919, Habibullah was assassinated while in his tent by Shuja ul-Dawla (one of the pages who slept in his tent) on orders from his younger son, Amanullah, leaving Nasrullah as successor to the Afghan throne. Nasrullah at first refused to take the throne and declared his allegiance to Inayatullah, Habibullah's first born son. Inayatullah refused and said that his father had made Nasrullah the rightful heir and wanted him to become Emir. All the local tribespeople gave their allegiance to Nasrullah, who was a pious and religious man.

The remainder of Habibullah's party journeyed southeast to Jalalabad, and on 21 February 1919 reached the city, where Nasrullah was declared Emir, supported by Habibullah's first son Inayatullah.

Amanullah Khan, third son of Habibullah by Habibullah's first wife, had remained in Kabul as the king's representative. Upon receiving the news of his father's death, Amanullah immediately seized control of the treasury at Kabul and staged a coup against his uncle. He took control of Kabul and the central government, declaring war against Nasrullah. Nasrullah did not want any bloodshed in order for him to be king. He told Amanullah that he could have the kingdom, and he would go into exile in Saudi Arabia. Amanullah Khan swore upon the Quran that no harm would come to Nasrullah if he returned to Kabul and then he could do as he pleased. On 28 February 1919, Amanullah proclaimed himself Emir.  On 3 March 1919, fearing that Nasrullah's supporters would rise against Amanullah, he subsequently went against his word. Nasrullah was arrested and imprisoned by Amanullah's forces.

On 13 April 1919, Amanullah held a Durbar (a royal court under the supervision of Amanullah) in Kabul which inquired into the death of Habibullah. It found a colonel in the Afghanistan military guilty of the crime, and had him executed. On manufactured evidence, it found Nasrullah complicit in the assassination.  Nasrullah was sentenced to life imprisonment but Amanullah had him assassinated approximately one year later while being held in the royal jail.

Russia had recently undergone its Communist revolution leading to strained relations between the country and the United Kingdom. Amanullah Khan recognized the opportunity to use the situation to gain Afghanistan's independence over its foreign affairs. He led a surprise attack against the British in India on 3 May 1919, beginning the Third Anglo-Afghan war. After initial successes, the war quickly became a stalemate as the United Kingdom was still dealing with the costs of World War I. An armistice was reached towards the end of 1919, which led to Afghanistan being freed of British diplomatic influence.

Reforms

Administrative and Political Reforms
Amanullah conceptualized a modernist constitution that incorporated equal rights and individual freedoms with the guidance of his father-in-law and Foreign Minister Mahmud Tarzi. To ensure national unity based on equal rights for all people before the law and their participation in the political development of the country, he drafted the country's first constitution, the "Statute of the Supreme Government of Afghanistan," which was officially approved and ratified by 872 tribal elders and government officials gathered in a Loya Jirga in Jalalabad on 11 April 1922. Under Sharia law and government-enacted legislation, all citizens were entitled to equal rights and freedoms, according to article 16 of the constitution.

Economic Reforms
Amanullah Khan's economic policy, which aimed to increase exports, reduce import volume, build national industries, and break the country's economic isolation as a result of its proclamation of independence, resulted in extensive quality improvements in the country's economy.

Education and Literature
Amanullah enjoyed early popularity within Afghanistan and he used his influence to modernise the country. Amanullah created new more cosmopolitan schools for both boys and girls in the regions and overturned centuries-old traditions such as strict dress codes for women. Various educational facilities, such as the Telegraph School, the Arabic Learning Academy or Daruloloom, Mastoorat School, Rashidya School in Jalalabad, Kandahar, and Mazar-e-sharif, Qataghan School, and the Academy of Basic Medical Sciences, as well as more than 320 schools, were established across all provinces. These schools initially had Indian instructors who were then replaced by French teachers. Primary education became obligatory, and literacy courses were developed to foster and improve reading abilities. Later, courses for teaching religious subjects and modern sciences were developed, with Amanullah Khan himself teaching some of them.

Despite Dari being the official language, the Pashto language was promoted as an important aspect of Afghan identity by Amanullah Khan. By the 1930s, a campaign had begun with the intention of making Pashto the Afghan government's official language. Pashto was declared an official language in 1936, and this was reaffirmed in 1964.

Cultural Reforms
Amanullah's wife, Queen Soraya Tarzi played a significant role regarding his policy towards women. This rapid modernisation created a backlash and a reactionary uprising known as the Khost rebellion which was suppressed in 1925. Amanullah met with many followers of the Baháʼí Faith in India and Europe, from where he brought back books that are still to be found in the Kabul Library. This association later served as one of the accusations against him when he was overthrown.

The failure of Amanullah Khan's reforms, like that of any other major political phenomena, was the result of a complex set of internal and external variables, some of which were objective in origin and others of which were linked to secret service organisations operating outside the country's borders. On the one hand, objective reasons arose from existing tensions between the changes being implemented and the interests of society's ruling class. At the time, Afghanistan's foreign policy was primarily concerned with the rivalry between the Soviet Union and the United Kingdom, the so-called Great Game. Each attempted to gain influence in Afghanistan and foil attempts by the other power to gain influence in the region. This effect was inconsistent, but generally favourable for Afghanistan; Amanullah established a limited Afghan Air Force consisting of donated Soviet planes.

Visit to Europe
Amanullah travelled to Europe in late 1927. The Afghan King and Queen set out from Karachi and en-route they met with King Fuad of Egypt in Cairo. They undertook a whirlwind European visit: Italy (arrived 8 January 1928), where they met with King Victor-Emanuel III of Italy along with his Prime Minister, Benito Mussolini and then Pope Pius XI in the Vatican City; France, (arrived in Nice on 22 January 1928 and then Paris on 25 January), meeting with President Doumergue; Belgium, arrived in Brussels on 8 February), meeting with King Albert I and Queen Elisabeth of Belgium. The next stop was Germany. The germanophile king arrived in Berlin on 22 February and met with President Paul von Hindenburg the same day.

He travelled to Great Britain as guests of King George V and Queen Mary. The steam ship SS Maid of Orleans arrived in Dover on 13 March 1928. The royal couple left England on 5 April and made their way to Poland. On their way, they had a longer stopover in Berlin where the Amanullah underwent an emergency tonsillectomy. The royal train with the Emir back on board arrived in the Polish border town of Zbąszyń on 28 April. The next day it pulled into Warsaw to be met by Polish ministers, the speaker of the Sejm and the country's president Ignacy Mościcki. At his request Amanullah was granted an audience with the First Marshal of Poland Józef Piłsudski. The Afghan party departed from Warsaw travelling east across the country to the border with the Soviet Union on 2 May 1928.

Civil War

During Amanullah's visit to Europe, opposition to his rule increased to the point where an uprising in Jalalabad culminated in a march to the capital, and much of the army deserted instead of resisting.

In January 1929, Amanullah abdicated and went into temporary exile in then British India. His brother Inayatullah Khan became the next king of Afghanistan for a few days until Habibullah Kalakani, a leader of the "Saqqawists" opposition movement, took over. Much of the resistance in support of Amanullah was confined to just one of the five "culture zones." The impacted area was a small "tribal zone" that encompassed the Eastern and Southern Provinces (Mashreqi and Jonub) in 1929, as well as the modern provinces of Nangarhar, Laghman, Kunar, Paktiya, and Paktika. The Shinwari, Mohmand, Kakar, Mangal, Jaji, Ahmadzai, Safi, Ghilzai, along with other Pashtun tribes populate most of this area. Hazarajat's Shi'a Hazarahs were strong supporters of Amanullah's reforms and hence resisted the Kalakani rule. Large portions of the country were not involved in either of the violent conflicts.

While Amanullah was in India, Kalakani battled anti-Saqqawist tribes. Around 22 March 1929, Amanullah returned to Afghanistan assembling forces in Kandahar to reach Kabul and to dispose of Kalakani. His forces failed to advance and on 23 May 1929 he fled to India again. He never returned to his country.

Exile 

Kalakani's rule lasted only nine months and he was replaced by Nadir Khan on 13 October 1929. Amanullah Khan attempted to return to Afghanistan, but he had little support from the people. From British India, the ex-king travelled to Europe and settled in Italy, buying a villa in Rome's Prati neighbourhood. Meanwhile, Nadir Khan made sure Amanullah's return to Afghanistan was made impossible by engaging in propaganda. Most of Amanullah's reforms were reversed, although later king Mohammad Zahir Shah made a more gradual program of reform.

Nevertheless, Amanullah still had a group of staunch supporters in Afghanistan. These Amanullah loyalists unsuccessfully attempted several times in the 1930s and 1940s to bring him back to power.

In 1941, some press in the west reported that Amanullah was now working as an agent for Nazi Germany in Berlin. It was believed he was involved in plans to regain his throne with Axis help, despite Afghanistan's neutrality. Following the Axis loss in Stalingrad in 1943, the plans were abandoned.

Death 

After fleeing to India, King Amanullah Khan sought asylum in Italy because he was given the Order of the Annunciation by King Victor Emmanuel III on his world tour. He died in 1960, either in Italy or in Zürich, Switzerland. His body was brought to Afghanistan and buried in the eastern city of Jalalabad. He left behind his widowed wife and four sons and five daughters, including Princess India of Afghanistan.

Marriage
He married Soraya Tarzi (1899–1968), daughter of H.E. Sardar-i-Ala Mahmud Beg Tarzi, sometime Minister for Foreign Affairs, by his second wife, Asma Rasmiya Khanum, daughter of Shaikh Muhammad Saleh al-Fattal Effendi, of Aleppo. Amanullah and Soraya had 6 daughters and 4 sons:
Princess Ameenah Shah (14 May 1916 – 29 October 1992). During her exile, in 1954 she married a naturalised Turkish citizen of Bosnian origin named Mustafa Hasanovic Ar. He was the son of the deputy of the Bosnian Young Muslims.
Princess Abedah Bibi 
Princess Meliha (1920–2011). She became a medical doctor in Istanbul University, and married Turkish engineer A. Tahir Söker, a close relative of Celâl Bayar.
Crown Prince Rahmatullah of Afghanistan (7 June 1921 – 11 September 2009). He married Adelia Graziani, a niece of an Italian general Rodolfo Graziani.
 Prince Saifullah died young from bronchial pneumonia. 
Prince Hymayatullah died very young from bronchial pneumonia.
Princess Adeela (1925–2000) married Armando Angelini (b. August 10, 1924), the son of an Italian cavalry officer and they had four daughters: 
Elisabetta (b. 31 May 1948)
Cristina (b. 3 Oct 1949)
Simin (b. 8 Oct 1954)
Cinzia (b. 11 Jan 1957)
Prince Ehsanullah (1926–2017) married Leyla Tarzi, daughter of Col. Tavvab Tarzi, son of Mahmud Tarzi. They had 2 sons, both born in Istanbul: 
Ahmed Aman Ullah (b. 1961), married Sylvie Théobald Rahmat Ullah (b. at Bourges, Cher, France)
Rahmad Ullah, (b. 1965), married Carine d'Afghanistan-Berger, of Bernex, Switzerland.
 Princess India (b. 1929). In 1951 she married Kazem Malek, an Iranian landowner, and settled in Mashhad, Iran. They had two daughters: Soraya, born in 1954 in Rome, Italy, and Hamdam, born in Mashad, Iran in 1956. After eight years of marriage Princess India divorced her husband and returned to Rome to live with her two daughters. In 1966 she married an Afghan businessman, Abdul Rauf Haider. They had a son named Eskandar who was born in Rome in 1967. In 1968, Princess India returned to Afghanistan after the death of her mother Queen Soraya. She attended funeral ceremonies in Jalalabad and was very much impressed by her homeland and decided from that time on she would work for the benefit of Afghanistan.
Soraya (b. 1954), first daughter of Princess India
Haman (b. 1956), second daughter of Princess India and her husband Kazem Malek.  Haman later married an Italian naval commander, Paolo Fusarini. The couple had two children, Matteo and Flavia.
Eskandar (b. 1967), son of Princess India and Abdul Rauf Haider.
Princess Nagia, the youngest daughter of Amanullah and Soraya. She married İlter Doğan, a Turkish businessman whom she met on her visit to Istanbul.  They have two children.
Ömer, son of Princess Nagia and İlter Doğan
Hümeyra, daughter of Princess Nagia and İlter Doğan

Amanullah later married his fourth wife, 'Aliya Begum (b. 1910), who was the daughter of his uncle, Field Marshal H.R.H. Shahzada Nasru'llah Khan, Naib us-Sultana, Itwad ud-Daula, GCMG, by his sixth wife, Gulshan Begum.

Amanullah was later married in Rome, before 1 July 1937, to an Italian lady, by whom he had one son.

 Prince Nadiru'llah Khan (Prince Nadir Ullah d'Afghanistan). (b. 17 June 1943). The only son and child of Amanullah Khan and his fifth wife. His first marriage was to Rita Rocco. His second marriage was to Ricarda Brinkmann, a German national. Nadiru'llah has two sons:
 Aman Ullah d'Afghanistan. (b. 14 June 1969) who was the son of Prince Nadiru'llah Khan with his first wife Rita Rocco. He settled in Rome, Italy.
 Ahmed Reinhold Ullah d'Afghanistan. (b. 28 January 1976) who was the son of Prince Nadiru'llah Khan with his second wife Ricarda Brinkmann. He settled in Asuncion, Paraguay.

See also 

History of Afghanistan
Reforms of Amānullāh Khān and civil war
Lycées Esteqlal and Malalaï in Kabul
Order of the Supreme Sun
Amir Amanullah Khan Award

References

Bibliography

External links 

 Amanulla Khan: Betrayal of Nadir Khan
 Ghazi Amanullah Khan City next to Jalalabad
 
 

 
1892 births
1960 deaths
20th-century Afghan monarchs
Afghan Sunni Muslims
Kings of Afghanistan
20th-century Afghan politicians
Emirs of Afghanistan
Barakzai dynasty
Amanullah Khan
Afghan secularists
Pashtun people
People from Kabul Province
People of the Third Anglo-Afghan War
Afghan exiles
Monarchs who abdicated
Recipients of the Order of the White Eagle (Poland)
Grand Crosses of the Order of the Crown (Belgium)
Grand Croix of the Légion d'honneur
Commandeurs of the Ordre des Palmes Académiques
Knights Grand Cross of the Order of Saints Maurice and Lazarus
Knights of the Holy See
Grand Crosses of the Order of Christ (Portugal)
Honorary Knights Grand Cross of the Royal Victorian Order
Afghan Civil War (1928–1929)